The 2003 attack on the Pakistan Embassy in Kabul occurred when up to 500 Afghan protesters overran the embassy of Pakistan on 9 July 2003. It was the second major attack since 1995, when the embassy was also assaulted by Afghan protesters.

Attack
The prior demonstration and protests against the alleged border incursions by Pakistan Armed Forces culminated in the attack and ransacking of the premises. The protesters shattered windows, broke down doors, and set the Pakistan flag on fire. No one was injured. The High Commissioner Rustam Mohmand of Pakistan accused the Afghan government of being unable to police its own capital, demanding compensation and announcing the embassy would remain closed. After the incident, Afghan President Hamid Karzai officially apologised for the rampage and made a personal apology during a 25-minute conversation, stating that no such incident would happen again. 

At approximately 9:30 AM, 500 protesters chanting "Anti-Pakistan slogans" descended on the Pakistan High Commission building. Testimony of nearby Western diplomats and staff revealed that Afghan officials were aware of the protest, though they apparently assigned no extra security.

See also
 1995 attack on the Pakistan embassy in Kabul
 List of massacres in Afghanistan

References

Attacks on diplomatic missions in Afghanistan
Kabul 2003
Terrorist incidents in Kabul
Terrorist incidents in Afghanistan in 2003
2003 in international relations
Anti-Pakistan sentiment
Afghanistan–Pakistan relations
2003 in Kabul
July 2003 events in Asia
Military operations of the War in Afghanistan (2001–2021)
Attacks in Afghanistan in 2003